Solanum interandinum is a species of plant in the family Solanaceae. It is endemic to Ecuador.

References

interandinum
Endemic flora of Ecuador
Vulnerable flora of South America
Taxonomy articles created by Polbot